Rash Behari Bose (25 May 1886 – 21 January 1945) was an Indian revolutionary leader who fought against the British Empire. He was one of the key organisers of the Ghadar Mutiny and founded the First Indian National Army during World War II. The Indian National Army (I. N. A.) was formed in 1942 under Bose which he later handed over as the Indian National Army to Subhas Chandra Bose.

Birth and ancestry
Rash Behari Bose was born in parala-bighati village of Hoogly district of west Bengal, on 25 May 1886 in a Bengali Kayastha family.  Bose grew up during the severe pandemics and famines of the British Raj. It nutured his dislike for British Rule. His father's name was Binod Behari Bose and mother was Bhubaneswari Devi. Tinkori Dasi was Rashbehari Bose's foster mother. Rash Behari Bose passed his childhood in his paternal home at his native village of Subaldaha under the care of his grandparents Kali Charan Bose and Bidhumukhi Debi.

Early life 
Rashbehari Bose and his sister Sushila (later, Sushila Sarkar) spent their childhood in the village of Subidha. They lived in the house of madam Bidhu Mukhi and his paternal house. Bidhu mukhi was a widow from her early life. Bidhu mukhi was the sister-in-law of Kalicharan Bose. So that his grandson would arrive safely to them. So his grandson was given by another name of Lord Krishna. His early education was completed under the supervision of his grandfather, Kalicharan Bose, at village Pathsala (Presently "Subidha Rashbehari Bose F.P School"). Rash Behari Bose got an education of Lathi Khela in his child at Subidha, primarily under the guidance of his grandfather. He got the inspiration of revolutionary movement hearing stories from his grandfather and teacher (Backward) at his birthplace Subidha. He was the cynosure of all villagers. His nickname was Rasu. He was stubborn and the villagers loved him very much. It is heard from villagers that he was at Subidha till he was 12 or 14 years old. His father, Binod Behari Bose, was stationed in Hooghly district for few years. During this time, Rashbehari had to move to his maternal house in Chandernagar.

In Chandernagar, Rashbehari Bose studied at Dupleix College with his cousin and friend Shrish Chandra Ghosh.  The principal Charu Chandra Roy inspired them into revolutionary politics. Later he joined "Morton school" in Kolkata. Bose later earned degrees in the medical sciences as well as in Engineering from France and Germany.

Revolutionary activities

He was interested in revolutionary activities from early on in his life, he left Bengal to shun the Alipore bomb case trials of (1908). At Dehradun he worked as a head clerk at the Forest Research Institute. There, through Amarendra Chatterjee of the Jugantar led by Jatin Mukherjee (Bagha Jatin), he secretly got involved with the revolutionaries of Bengal and he came across eminent revolutionary members of the Arya Samaj in the United Provinces (currently Uttar Pradesh) and the Punjab. 

Following the attempt to assassinate Lord Hardinge, Rash Behari was forced to go into hiding. The attempt was made on 23 December 1912 in Delhi when Lord Hardinge was in a ceremonial procession transferring the capital from Calcutta to New Delhi. He was attacked near the Red Fort by Basanta Kumar Biswas, a disciple of Amrendar Chatterjee, but missed the target. The bomb was made by Manindra Nath Nayak. Bose was hunted by the colonial police due to his active participation in the failed assassination attempt directed at the Governor General and Viceroy Lord Charles Hardinge in Delhi. He returned to Dehradun  by the night train and joined the office the next day as though nothing had happened. Further, he organized a meeting of loyal citizens of Dehradun to condemn the dastardly attack on the Viceroy.

Lord Hardinge, in his My Indian Years, described the whole incident in an interesting way. During the flood relief work in Bengal in 1913, he came in contact with Jatin Mukherjee in whom he "discovered a real leader of men," who "added a new impulse" to Rash Behari's failing zeal. Thus during World War I he became extensively involved as one of the leading figures of the Gadar Revolution that attempted to trigger a mutiny in India in February 1915. Trusted and tried Ghadrites were sent to several cantonments to infiltrate into the army. The idea of the Gadar leaders was that with the war raging in Europe most of the soldiers had gone out of India and the rest could be easily won over. The revolution failed and most of the revolutionaries were arrested. But Rash Behari managed to escape British intelligence and reached Japan in 1915.

Indian National Army
Bose fled to Japan in 1915, under the alias of Priyanath Thakur, a relative of Rabindranath Thakur. There, Bose found shelter with various Pan-Asian groups. From 1915 to 1918, he changed residences and identities numerous times, as the British kept pressing the Japanese government for his extradition. He married the daughter of Aizō Sōma and Kokkō Sōma, the owners of Nakamuraya bakery in Tokyo and noted Pan-Asian supporters in 1918, and became a Japanese citizen in 1923, living as a journalist and writer. It is also significant that he was instrumental in introducing Indian-style curry in Japan. Though more expensive than the usual "British-style" curry, it became quite popular, with Rash Bihari becoming known as "Bose of Nakamuraya".

Bose along with A M Nair was instrumental in persuading the Japanese authorities to stand by the Indian patriots and ultimately to officially actively support the Indian independence struggle abroad. Bose convened a conference in Tokyo on 28–30 March 1942, which decided to establish the Indian Independence League. At the conference, he moved a motion to raise an army for Indian independence. He convened the second conference of the League at Bangkok on 22 June 1942. It was at this conference that a resolution was adopted to invite Subhas Chandra Bose to join the League and take its command as its president.

The Indian prisoners of war captured by the Japanese in the Malaya and Burma fronts were encouraged to join the Indian Independence League and become the soldiers of the Indian National Army (INA), formed on 1 September 1942 as the military wing of Rash Behari Bose's Indian National League. He selected the flag for the Azad Hind movement and handed over the flag to Subhas Chandra Bose. But although he handed over the power, his organizational structure remained, and it was on the organizational spadework of Rash Behari Bose. Rash Behari Bose built the Indian National Army (also called 'Azad Hind Fauj'). Prior to his death caused by tuberculosis, the Japanese Government honoured him with the Order of the Rising Sun (2nd grade).

Personal life 
Bose met Toshiko Soma when he was hiding at her house in Shinjuku City. She was the daughter of Aizō Sōma and Kokkō Sōma, the owners of Nakamuraya bakery (:ja:中村屋) in Tokyo and noted Pan-Asian supporters in 1918. At that time, Bose was a fugitive with the British searching for him. Their initial contact was during those intense moments of hiding though without any interactions. In 1916, when Bose was a fugitive no more, he invited the Soma family to his house as a gesture of gratitude. That was the first instance of their interaction in a social context.

However, Bose stuck out like a sore thumb in Japan. People would consider them with suspicion. Mitsuru Toyama, as a solution proposed to the Soma's a marriage between Toshiko and Rashbehari. He thought that marriage with a Japanese citizen would make it easy for Bose to apply for citizenship. Despite their initial reservations, the Somas agreed to the match. When asked, Toshiko took three weeks to give her consent.

They had a happy marriage lasting eight years. Bose taught Toshiko Bengali and how to wear a sari. Bose got Japanese citizenship in 1923. Toshiko's health declined soon after and it claimed her life in 1924. After her death, he never remarried. They were buried together after Bose's death.

They had two children together. Masahide Bose (Bharatchandra) was born in 1920. He died in World War II aged 24. Their daughter Tetsuko was born in 1922.

Legacy 
In the year of 1943, the Japanese government honoured him with the highest title given to a foreigner – The Second Order of Merit of the Rising Sun.

On 26 December 1967, the Posts and Telegraphs Department of India issued a special postage stamp in honour of Rash Behari Bose.
In the city of Kolkata, West Bengal, a street (Rash Behari Avenue) is named in his honour.

In popular culture 
In the 2019 Indian Bengali-language television series titled Netaji which depicts the life of Netaji Subhash Chandra Bose, Fahim Mirza played the role of Rash Behari Bose.

See also
Anushilan Samiti
Delhi-Lahore conspiracy
Hindu–German Conspiracy
Gadar Mutiny

References

Further reading

External links

Rash Behari Bose materials in the South Asian American Digital Archive (SAADA)
 The Indian revolutionary who fought to overthrow British rule while living in Japan CNN
Shinjuku Nakamuraya 新宿中村屋

Anushilan Samiti
1886 births
1945 deaths
Revolutionaries of Bengal during British Rule
Hindu–German Conspiracy
Indian Independence League
People from Bardhaman
Revolutionary movement for Indian independence
Bose, Rashbehari
Bose, Rashbehari
Indian National Army personnel
Japanese people of Indian descent
Subhas Chandra Bose
Indian exiles
Indian expatriates in Japan
Naturalized citizens of Japan
Recipients of the Order of the Rising Sun, 2nd class
British Malaya military personnel of World War II
Military personnel from West Bengal
20th-century Indian politicians
West Bengal politicians
Indian independence activists from West Bengal
20th-century deaths from tuberculosis
Tuberculosis deaths in Japan